Chumash may refer to:

Chumash (Judaism), a Hebrew word for the Pentateuch, used in Judaism
Chumash people, a Native American people of southern California
Chumashan languages, indigenous languages of California

See also 
 Pentateuch (disambiguation)
 Torah (disambiguation)
 Chumash (disambiguation)
 Tanak (disambiguation)
Chumash traditional narratives
Chumash Painted Cave State Historic Park in California
Chumash Wilderness, a wilderness area California
Chuvash (disambiguation)

Language and nationality disambiguation pages